6000 series may refer to:

Computers
 CDC 6000 series mainframe computer manufactured by Control Data Corporation
 Honeywell 6000 series mainframe computer manufactured by Honeywell
 PC-6000 series of consumer-grade personal computers manufactured by NEC
 Radeon HD 6000 series graphics processing units produced by AMD

Japanese train types
 Chichibu Railway 6000 series
 Fujikyu 6000 series
 Hankyu 6000 series
 JR Shikoku 6000 series
 Keihan 6000 series, operated by Keihan Electric Railway
 Keio 6000 series
 Kintetsu 6000 series, operated by Kintetsu Railway
 Kumamoto Electric Railway 6000 series, formerly operated by Toei Transportation
 Kobe Municipal Subway 6000 series
 Meitetsu 6000 series
 Nagoya Municipal Subway 6000 series
 Nankai 6000 series, operated by Nankai Electric Railway
 Nishitetsu 6000 series, operated by Nishi-Nippon Railroad
 Sanyo 6000 series
 Sapporo Municipal Subway 6000 series 
 Seibu 6000 series
 Shintetsu 6000 series
 Sotetsu 6000 series
 Tobu 6000 series, operated by Tobu Railway
 Toei 6000 series
 Tokyo Metro 6000 series
 Tokyu 6000 series

Other train types
 6000 series (Chicago "L")
 Seoul Metro 6000 series